Iosefa is a Samoan name that may refer to the following people
Given name
Iosefa Enari (1954–2000), New Zealand opera singer 
Iosefa Enari Memorial Award
Iosefa Maposua (born 1977), Samoan association football defender 
Joe Tekori (born Iosefa Tekori in 1983), Samoan rugby union player 

Surname
Joey Iosefa (born 1991), American football fullback 
Masada Iosefa (born 1988), Samoan rugby league footballer 
Telupe Iosefa (born 1986), Tuvaluan powerlifter 
Fofó Iosefa Fiti Sunia (born 1937), Samoan politician

See also
Josepha
Josefa (given name)